Shaitaan Haveli is an Indian horror comedy streaming television series created by Varun Thakur, directed by Ajay Singh and produced by OML Production. The show stars Bhupesh Singh, Varun Thakur and Neha Chauhan. Shaitaan Haveli premiered on 5 January 2018 on Amazon Prime Video.

Episodes

References 

Amazon Prime Video original programming
2018 Indian television series debuts
2018 Indian television series endings
Indian horror fiction television series
Indian comedy television series
Horror comedy television series
Bollywood in fiction
Television series about filmmaking